Chrysopilus proximus is a species of snipe fly in the family Rhagionidae.

Distribustion
United States

References

Rhagionidae
Insects described in 1848
Diptera of North America
Taxa named by Francis Walker (entomologist)